Haifa District (Mehoz Ḥeifa) is an administrative district surrounding the city of Haifa, Israel. The district is one of the seven administrative districts of Israel, and its capital is Haifa. The district land area is 864 km2 (299.3 mi2).

Demographics
According to the Israeli Central Bureau of Statistics data for 2016:
 Total population: 996,300
 Ethnic:
 Jews: 642,700 (69.4%)
 Arabs: 233,000 (25.1%)
 Others: 51,000 (5.5%)
 Religious (as of 2017):
 Jews: 684,100 (68.6%)
 Muslims: 213,400 (21.4%)
 Druze: 26,300 (2.6%)
 Christians: 17,600 (1.7%)
 Not classified: 56,300 (5.6%)

Administrative local authorities

See also
Districts of Israel
List of cities in Israel
Arab localities in Israel
Wadi Ara

References